X Minus One is an American half-hour science fiction radio drama series that was broadcast from April 24, 1955, to January 9, 1958, in various timeslots on NBC. Known for high production values in adapting stories from the leading American authors of the era, X Minus One has been described as one of the finest offerings of American radio drama and one of the best science fiction series in any medium.

Overview 
Initially a revival of NBC's Dimension X (1950–51), the first 15 episodes of X Minus One were new versions of Dimension X episodes, but the remainder were adaptations by NBC staff writers, including Ernest Kinoy and George Lefferts, of newly published science fiction stories by leading writers in the field, including Isaac Asimov, Ray Bradbury, Philip K. Dick, Robert A. Heinlein, Frederik Pohl and Theodore Sturgeon, along with some original scripts by Kinoy and Lefferts.

Included in the series were adaptations of Robert Sheckley's "Skulking Permit", Bradbury's "Mars Is Heaven", Heinlein's "Universe" and "The Green Hills of Earth", Pohl's "The Tunnel under the World", J. T. McIntosh’s "Hallucination Orbit", Fritz Leiber’s "A Pail of Air", and George Lefferts' "The Parade".

The program opened with announcer Fred Collins delivering the countdown, leading into the following introduction (although later shows beginning with Episode 37, were partnered with Galaxy Science Fiction  rather than Astounding Science Fiction):

The series was canceled after the 126th broadcast on January 9, 1958. However, the early 1970s brought a wave of nostalgia for old-time radio; a new experimental episode, "The Iron Chancellor" by Robert Silverberg, was produced in 1973, but it failed to revive the series. NBC also tried broadcasting the old recordings, but their irregular once-monthly scheduling kept even devoted listeners from following the broadcasts.

The series was re-released in podcast form beginning on June 22, 2007.

In November 2008, Counter-Productions Theatre Company became the first theater company to stage three episodes, "The Parade", "A Logic Named Joe", and "Hallucination Orbit".

Episodes based on stories by famous writers
 Poul Anderson – "The Light"
 Isaac Asimov – "Nightfall", "C-Chute", "Hostess"
 James Blish – "Surface Tension"
 Robert Bloch – "Almost Human"
 Ray Bradbury – "And The Moon Be Still As Bright", "Mars is Heaven!", "The Veldt", "Dwellers in Silence", "Zero Hour", "To the Future", "Marionettes, Inc.", "There Will Come Soft Rains"
 L. Sprague de Camp – "A Gun for Dinosaur"
 Mark Clifton – "Star, Bright"
 Philip K. Dick – "The Defenders", "Colony"
 Thomas Godwin – "The Cold Equations"
 Robert A. Heinlein – "Universe", "The Green Hills of Earth", "Requiem", "The Roads Must Roll"
 Fritz Leiber – "A Pail of Air", "Appointment in Tomorrow", "The Moon is Green"
 Frederik Pohl – "The Haunted Corpse", "Tunnel under the World", "Target One", "The Map Makers"
 Robert Sheckley – "Skulking Permit", "The Lifeboat Mutiney", "Protection", "Early Model", "The Seventh Victim", "Something for Nothing", "The Native Problem", "Bad Medicine"
 Robert Silverberg – "Double Dare", "The Iron Chancellor"
 Clifford D. Simak – "Courtesy", "Junkyard", "How-2", "Project Mastodon", "Drop Dead", "Lulu"
 Theodore Sturgeon – "Mr. Costello, Hero", "Saucer of Loneliness", "The Stars are the Styx"
 William Tenn – "Venus is for Men"

Episodes

See also
 2000 Plus, (Mutual) The first adult science fiction series on U.S. radio.
 Dimension X, (NBC) The predecessor to X Minus One with 15 of the same stories.
 Exploring Tomorrow, (Mutual) A 1957–1958 series narrated by John W. Campbell
 Golden Age of Radio
 Tales of Tomorrow, (ABC) A short lived 1953 radio anthology with only 15 episodes, 4 stories of which were also made into X Minus One episodes.

References

External links

OTR Plot Spot: X Minus One – plot summaries and reviews
X Minus One the official fansite! at xminusone.com

X Minus One at oldclassicradio.com

1955 radio programme debuts
1958 radio programme endings
American radio dramas
Anthology radio series
American science fiction radio programs
Science fiction podcasts
1950s American radio programs
NBC radio programs